The Erionotini are a tribe of skipper butterflies in the subfamily Hesperiinae.

Genera

References

 , 1996: The Pteroteinon caenira-complex of African skippers, with the description of a new species (P. concaenira) (Lepidoptera: Hesperiidae). Lambillionea 96(4): 616-622. 
 , 2000: Hesperiidae of Vietnam: 6. Two new species of the genera Suada de Nicéville, 1895 and Quedara Swinhoe, 1907 (Lepidoptera: Hesperiidae). Atalanta 31 (1/2): 193-197.
 , 2004: Taxonomic studies on Oriental Hesperiidae, 1. A revision of the Scobura coniata Hering, 1918-group. (Lepidoptera: Hesperiidae). Atalanta 35 (1-2): 57-66.
 , 2007: Hesperiidae of Vietnam, 16. A new species and a new record of the Hesperiidae from Central Vietnam, with a revisional note on the genus Hidari Distant, 1886 (Lepidoptera: Hesperiidae). Atalanta 38 (3-4): 347-349.
  2003: Hesperiidae of Vietnam, 15. New records of Hesperiidae from southern Vietnam (Lepidoptera: Hesperiidae). Atalanta 34 (1/2): 119-133.
 , 2005: Some notes on butterflies from Sumatra and Siberut, Indonesia, withdescription of a new subspecies (Lepidoptera: Acraeidae, Nymphalidae, Hesperiidae). Futao 50: 7-10.
 , 1998: Butterflies from a Guinea savannah transition area, the Parc National du Haut Niger (Republic of Guinea), with description of a new subspecies of Platylesches robustus (Lepidoptera: Hesperiidae). Boll. Soc. Entomol. Ital. 130 (3): 255-272.
 , 1971: Descriptions of new species and notes on other Hesperiidae of Africa. Bull. Allyn Museum 2: 1-17. Full article:  
 , 2008: Checklist of Afrotropical Papilionoidea and Hesperoidea.

 
Butterfly tribes